Streptomyces massasporeus is a bacterium species from the genus of Streptomyces which has been isolated from soil in Japan.

Further reading

See also 
 List of Streptomyces species

References

External links
Type strain of Streptomyces massasporeus at BacDive -  the Bacterial Diversity Metadatabase	

massasporeus
Bacteria described in 1959